Danane is a coastal town in the southern Lower Shebelle province of Somalia.

History 
In the past the Italians set a concentration camp in the town for people that resisted the Italian colonial leaders in Ethiopia. Many Ethiopians were detained in Danane.

Demographics 
Danane is the traditional territory and primarily inhabited Bimal clan

References 

Populated places in Lower Shebelle